The 1998 NAPA Auto Parts Sebring Classic presented by Royal Purple Motor Oil was the sixth round of the 1998 IMSA GT Championship season. It took place on September 20, 1998.

Race results
Class winners in bold.

Sebring Classic
Sebring Classic